The grey-hooded parrotbill (Sinosuthora zappeyi) is a species of parrotbill in the family Paradoxornithidae.
It is endemic to China.
Its natural habitats are temperate forests and temperate shrubland.
It is threatened by habitat loss.

References

Sources
 BirdLife International 2004.  Paradoxornis zappeyi.   2006 IUCN Red List of Threatened Species.   Downloaded on 26 July 2007.
Robson, C. (2007). Family Paradoxornithidae (Parrotbills) pp.  292–321 in; del Hoyo, J., Elliott, A. & Christie, D.A. eds. Handbook of the Birds of the World, Vol. 12. Picathartes to Tits and Chickadees. Lynx Edicions, Barcelona.

External links
BirdLife Species Factsheet.

grey-hooded parrotbill
Birds of Central China
Endemic birds of China
grey-hooded parrotbill
grey-hooded parrotbill
Taxonomy articles created by Polbot